Veselovsky Reservoir (aka Veselovskoye Reservoir) is a reservoir on the western Manych River in Rostov-on-Don, Rostov Oblast. Combined with the Proletarsky Reservoir directly upstream, the pair is also referred to as the Manychysky Reservoirs, built between 1932 and 1936 to provide longstanding river flow. The Veselovsky Reservoir is currently used for irrigation, fisheries, water traffic and power generation.

The reservoir lies between the Proletarskoje and Ust'-Manychskoe reservoirs.

There is the late Paleolithic camp Yulovskaja  on the southeast shore of the Veselovsky Reservoir.

Physical geography
The southern bank has a sloping surface that is mostly covered with reeds. Other parts of the shore are fortified with white acacia plantations. Rice cultivation is also done on the northern and eastern regions of the reservoir bank.

The reservoir has numerous islands, namely Russkij, Bolshoy, Sen’kina, Krolichij, Zherebkov, and Darzhinskij.

The hydrographic web is weakly developed. The reservoir is situated between the Sal’sko-Manychevskoja Ridge and Stavropolskaja Hills.

The normal retaining level (NRL) of the reservoir is more than 7 meters.

Climate

The reservoir is found in a continental moderate climate. As the continentality of the climate increases, the amount of precipitation decreases.

Communities
The village of Veselij and the hamlets of Karkashev, Russkij, Dalnij, and Stepnoy Kurgan are located on the banks of the Veselovsky Reservoir. Proletarsk sits on the bank of the bay.

Flora and fauna
The flora of the reservoir and its floodplain include different kinds of reed, tuberecamysh, cattail, knotweed, hornwort, bosom, scab, and other plants, including 87 kinds of phytoplankton.

The reservoir contains 33 species of fish and fishing is primarily concentrated on bream, Rutilus lacustris, and zander. There are 3 species of amphibians, 8 species of reptiles, 19 species of rare and endangered birds, and 2 red-listed species of mammals registered on the territory of the reservoir and nearby areas.

The Veselovsky Reservoir has a wetlands status that is of international importance and is secured by the Ramsar Convention on Wetlands.

References 

Reservoirs in Russia
Tourist attractions in Rostov-on-Don